Au Zénith is the second live album by singer Vanessa Paradis. Steve Nieve of Elvis Costello's The Attractions is featured on the keyboard. The album was recorded during her performances at Le Zénith during her Bliss Tour.

Track listing 
 Intro (music: Steve Nieve, Vanessa Paradis)  1:00
 "L'Eau et le Vin"  5:22  (Alain Bashung, Didier Golemanas, Richard Mortier; album Bliss, 2000)
 "Sunday Mondays"  4:47  (Henry Hirsch, Lenny Kravitz, Paradis; Vanessa Paradis, 1992)
 "Dans mon café"  4:13  (Golemanas, Franck Langolff; Bliss)
 "Walk on the Wild Side"  4:34  (Lou Reed; Variations sur le même t'aime, 1990)
 "Dis-lui toi que je t'aime"  4:22  (Serge Gainsbourg, Langolff; Variations sur le même t'aime)
 "L'Eau à la bouche"  2:11  (Gainsbourg; no album material)
 "Joe le Taxi"  4:08  (Étienne Roda-Gil, Langolff; M&J, 1988)
 "St Germain"  4:00  (Johnny Depp, Paradis; Bliss)
 "Requiem pour un con"  2:11  (Serge Gainsbourg; no album material)
 "Que fait la vie?"  4:01  (Golemanas, Paradis; Bliss)
 "La La La Song"  4:12  (Gerry DeVeaux, Paradis; Bliss)
 "This Will Be Our Year"  2:14  (Chris White from the Zombies; no album material)
 "Pourtant"  3:22  (Matthieu Chedid, Franck Monnet; Bliss)
 "Tandem"  4:10  (Gainsbourg, Langolff; Variations sur le même t'aime)
 "Commando"  4:19  (Golemanas, Langolff; Bliss)
 "Marilyn & John"  5:36  (Roda-Gil, Langolff; M&J)
 "Bliss"  5:03  (Depp, Paradis; Bliss)
 "Les Acrobates"  3:15  (Monnet, Paradis; Bliss)

Personnel
Jack Petruzzelli - guitar, keyboards, backing vocals
Boris Jardel - guitar, percussion, backing vocals
Bruce Witkin - bass, double bass, backing vocals
Steve Nieve - keyboards, backing vocals
Mathieu Rabaté - drums, percussion
Katisse Buckingham - saxophone, flute
Lee Thornburg - trumpet, backing vocals

Charts

Album

References 

Vanessa Paradis albums
2001 live albums